Westwood High School may refer to:

Canada
 Westwood High School Senior Campus, in Hudson, Quebec
 Westwood High School – Junior Campus, in Saint-Lazare, Quebec
 Westwood Community High School, in Fort McMurray, Alberta

Jamaica
 Westwood High School, Jamaica, Stewart Town, Trelawny, Jamaica

United Kingdom 
 Westwood College, Leek, previously known as Westwood High School, in Leek, Staffordshire
 Westwood Girls' College, previously known as Westwood High School, in Upper Norwood, London

United States 
 Westwood High School (Mesa, Arizona), in Mesa, Arizona
 Westwood High School (California), in Westwood, California; see California Conference
 Fort Pierce Westwood High School, in Fort Pierce, Florida
 Westwood Schools, in Camilla, Georgia
 Westwood High School (Iowa), a high school in Sloan, Iowa
 Westwood High School (Massachusetts), in Westwood, Massachusetts
 Westwood High School (Michigan), in Marquette County, Michigan
 Westwood Regional High School, serving Westwood, and Washington Township, New Jersey
 Westwood High School (South Carolina), in Richland County School District Two, Blythewood, South Carolina
 Westwood High School (Tennessee), a Memphis City School, Memphis, Tennessee
 Westwood High School (Austin, Texas), in Austin, Texas
 Westwood High School (Palestine, Texas), in Palestine, Texas
 Westwood High School (Wyoming), in Campbell County School District Number 1, Gillette, Wyoming